George Percival Dempster (28 August 1882 – 25 February 1960) was an Australian rules footballer for . He captained the club in 1911.

Dempster was born in Queenstown, South Australia, to Helen Wylie Caithness Begg and George Wafford Dempster.

References

1882 births
1960 deaths
People from Queenstown, South Australia
Port Adelaide Football Club (SANFL) players
Port Adelaide Football Club players (all competitions)
Australian rules footballers from South Australia